Carbohydrate sulfotransferase 1 is an enzyme that in humans is encoded by the CHST1 gene.

References

External links

Further reading